Edo van Belkom (born 1962) is a Canadian author of horror fiction.

Early life and education
Edo van Belkom was born in Toronto, Ontario, in 1962. he graduated from York University with an honors degree in creative writing. He worked as a full-time journalist for five years, first as a sports reporter at The Brampton Times from 1987 to 1990, then as a police reporter with the North York Mirror for two months, and then he had the position of assistant sports editor for the Cambridge Reporter. He re-evaluated his career and his finances and then became a full-time freelance writer in 1992. He has also taught short story writing for the Peel Board of Education, was an instructor at Sheridan College, and has lectured on horror and fantasy writing at the University of Toronto and Ryerson University.

Early in his career, he admired writers such as Kurt Vonnegut and Ray Bradbury before deciding that the horror genre was the best fit for him.

Career
Van Belkom is the author of the Dragonlance setting novel Lord Soth (1997), and the novels Wyrm Wolf, Mister Magick, Teeth, Martyrs, Scream Queen, Army of the Dead and Wolf Pack, amongst others. He is also the editor of Aurora Awards: An Anthology of Prize-Winning Science Fiction (1999).

He has published about 200 stories of science fiction, fantasy, horror and mystery in such magazines as Parsec, Storyteller, On Spec and RPM, and the anthologies Northern Frights 1, 2, 3, 4, Shock Rock 2, Fear Itself, Hot Blood 4, 6, Dark Destiny, Crossing the Line, Truth Until Paradox, Alternate Tyrants (where his story "The October Crisis" was featured), The Conspiracy Filed, Brothers of the Night, Robert Bloch's Psychos, Year's Best Horror Stories 20 and Best American Erotica 1999. His short story collection, Death Drives a Semi, which includes twenty of his stories, was published by Quarry Press in 1998. His non-fiction book, Northern Dreamers: Interviews with Famous Authors of Science Fiction, Fantasy, and Horror, published by Quarry Press in 1998, has interviews with twenty-two of the best writers in Canada. He also wrote a how-to book, Writing Horror.

He was hired as an on-air host at Scream-TV in 2001.

Van Belkom has been described by The Vancouver Sun as "one of Canada's leading writers of erotica", mostly under the pseudonym Evan Hollander. He wrote the how-to book Writing Erotica (2001).

Outside of the horror genre, for several years he wrote a magazine serial for Truck News that recounts the adventures of a former private investigator who becomes a trucker.

Awards
Wyrm Wolf is a Locus bestseller and a finalist for the 1995 Bram Stoker First Novel Award. In 1997, he won the Stoker Short Fiction Award from the Horror Writers Association for "Rat Food" (co-authored with David Nickle). His story, "The Rug" was a 1998 Stoker finalist. Other stories have twice been nominated for both the Aurora Award and the Arthur Ellis Award (presented by the Crime Writers of Canada). He has also won the Ontario Library Association's Silver Birch award.

Personal life
He lives in Brampton, Ontario, with his wife Roberta and son Luke. Roberta is a librarian.

See also
List of horror fiction authors

References

External links
Edo van Belkom's official webpage as of 2009, on Internet Archive's Wayback Machine

1962 births
20th-century Canadian novelists
21st-century Canadian novelists
Canadian fantasy writers
Canadian horror writers
Canadian male novelists
Living people
Writers from Toronto